May Enid Bosworth Nunn OAM (27 November 188715 July 1982), known professionally as Enid Lorimer and also as a publisher of children's literature under the pen name Ellen Bosworth, was a British-born Australian film, stage, television and radio actress, director, writer, teacher and theosophist. She was married to Count Wentworth Zerffi.

She attended His Majesty's Theatre in London, managed by Sir Herbert Beerbohm Tree and trained as a Shakespearean actress. She was a contemporary of Dame Sybil Thorndike and Dame Lilian Braithwaite. Lorimer was also involved in silent film production in Britain during World War 1, working with the likes of Dame Ellen Terry.

Early life
Lorimer was born on 27 November 1887, in London, United Kingdom. Her father was Harold Marcus Nunn and her mother was Helen Louise Fowler (née Bosworth).

Her early education was supervised by a governess. She later attended a boarding school in Folkestone, Kent, and a finishing school in Switzerland.

Career
Lorimer's career as an actress lasted for some 70 years. She first took stage drama in the United Kingdom, before leaving for Sydney, Australia in November 1923 to serve as Art Director at the Star Amphitheatre, Balmoral. She starred in numerous Australian television programmes, such as Motel, Spyforce, Homicide, Division 4 and Cop Shop, as well as many theatrical stage plays, and in 1966 she appeared as a narrator in fourteen episodes of the BBC children's television programme Jackanory. Up until her 85th birthday in 1973, she was very active within the entertainment circle and would not entertain the prospect of retirement, despite self-admitted signs of "phasing out". Her final film appearance was in The Odd Angry Shot. In her later years, she gradually declined from acting and instead started writing children's books, such as the series Shelley (which was based on her granddaughter), under the pseudonym of Ellen Bosworth. Many of her books were best-sellers in Australia. During her lifetime, Lorimer also worked as a teacher and a theosophist.

Recognition
Lorimer was awarded the Chips Rafferty Memorial Award in 1981 and the Medal of the Order of Australia (OAM) for her service towards the performing arts on 14 June 1982.

Enid Lorimer Circuit, in the Canberra suburb of Chisholm, is named in her honour.

Death
Lorimer died on 15 July 1982 at a private hospital in Wahroonga, New South Wales. A private funeral was held for her; only six people attended.

Filmography

FILM

TELEVISION

References

External links
 
Enid Lorimer at the Women Film Pioneers Project

1887 births
1982 deaths
20th-century Australian actresses
Actresses from London
Recipients of the Medal of the Order of Australia
English emigrants to Australia
Women film pioneers
19th-century Australian women
20th-century English women
20th-century English people